The Pakistan women's national cricket team toured Ireland and England in August and September 2012. In Ireland, they played Bangladesh in 1 One Day International and 1 Twenty20 International, as well as playing in the two Ireland Women's Tri-Series, against Bangladesh and Ireland. They then went to England, and played England in 2 T20Is and the West Indies in 1 T20I.

Tour of Ireland

Squads

Only ODI: Bangladesh v Pakistan

Ireland Women's ODI Tri-Series

Fixtures

Only T20I: Bangladesh v Pakistan

Ireland Women's T20 Tri-Series

Fixtures

Tour of England

Squads

Tour Matches

20-over match: England Under-19s v Pakistan

20-over match: England Under-19s v Pakistan

20-over match: England Academy v Pakistan

20-over match: England Academy v Pakistan

WT20I Series

1st T20I

2nd T20I

Only T20I: Pakistan v West Indies

See also
 2012 Ireland Women's Tri-Series
 Bangladeshi women's cricket team in Ireland in 2012
 West Indies women's cricket team in England in 2012

References

External links
Pakistan Women tour of England and Ireland 2012 from Cricinfo

Pakistan women's national cricket team tours
Women's cricket tours of England
Women's international cricket tours of Ireland
International cricket competitions in 2012
2012 in women's cricket
2012 in Pakistani women's sport